The 2021 Jordanian Pro League (known as The Jordanian Pro League,   was the 69th season of Jordanian Pro League since its inception in 1944. The season started on 8 April and finished on 4 November 2021,  Al-Ramtha won the title for the 3rd time after the first two titles in 1981 and 1982 .

Al-Wehdat are the defending champions of the 2020 season. Al-Baqa'a and Al-Jalil joined as the promoted clubs from the 2020 League Division 1. They replaced Al-Sareeh and Al-Ahli who were relegated to the 2021 League Division 1.

Teams
Twelve teams will compete in the league – the top ten teams from the 2020 season and the two teams promoted from the 2020 Division 1.

Teams promoted to the 2021 Premier League

The first team to be promoted was Al-Jalil, following their 2–0 victory against Al-Sarhan on 22 January 2021. Al-Jalil returned to the Premier League for the first time since the 2011–12 season.

The second team to be promoted was Al-Baqa'a, following their 3-1 victory against Moghayer Al-Sarhan on 28 January 2021, the last day of the regular season.

Teams relegated to the 2021 Division 1

The first team to be relegated was Al-Ahli, following their 0–1 defeat against Shabab Al-Aqaba, ending their 6-years stay in the top flight.

The second team to be relegated was Al-Sareeh, ending their 3-years stay in the top flight.

Map

Stadiums and locations
Note: Table lists in alphabetical order.

Personnel and kits

Foreign players

League table

Results

Season progress

Statistics

Scoring
First goal of the season:   Roddy Manga for Al-Hussein against Ma'an (8 April 2021)
Last goal of the season:   Soony Saad for Al-Wehdat against Shabab Al-Aqaba (4 November2021)

Top scorers

Hat-tricks

References

Jordanian Pro League seasons
2020–21 in Jordanian football
Jordan Premier League